Andrea Di Stefano (born 15 December 1972) is an Italian actor and film director.

Life and career
Born in Rome, he moved to New York City to study acting at the Actors Studio. In the U.S. he played in Smile, an independent movie directed by Andrew Hunt.

He played the leading role in the 1997 film Il principe di Homburg directed by Marco Bellocchio and entered into the 1997 Cannes Film Festival. He has played in films such as Il fantasma dell'opera by Dario Argento, Almost Blue by Alex Infascelli, and Angela by Roberta Torre.

Lately, he played the role of Giancarlo in the movie Cuore Sacro directed by Ferzan Özpetek.

Andrea Di Stefano has also appeared in many TV episodes. In 1999 he played the role of Fabrizio Canepa in Ama il tuo nemico by Damiano Damiani. In 2006 he played in the TV movie I colori della gioventù directed by Gianluigi Calderone and in the most recent Medicina generale broadcast in spring 2007 in which he played Giacomo Pogliani, a talented doctor in a big Roman hospital.

In 2012, he portrayed a priest in the Academy Award-winning film Life of Pi.

In 2014, di Stefano wrote and directed his first feature film, Escobar: Paradise Lost, starring Benicio del Toro and Josh Hutcherson.

In 2016, he played the role of Philip Catelli, in In guerra per amore, directed by PIF.

In 2019, he co-wrote (with Matt Cook and Rowan Joffé) and directed The Informer, adapted from the crime novel by Börge Hellström and Anders Roslund.

In 2023, Di Stefano directed a mystery thriller film Last Night of Amore. The film was screened at the 73rd Berlin International Film Festival in Berlinale Special on 24 February 2023.

References

External links 

1972 births
Italian male film actors
Living people
20th-century Italian male actors
21st-century Italian male actors
Male actors from Rome
Actors Studio alumni
Italian directors